The 2009 Arkansas Razorbacks football team represented the University of Arkansas in the 2009 NCAA Division I FBS football season. The Razorbacks played five home games at Donald W. Reynolds Razorback Stadium in Fayetteville, Arkansas and two home games at War Memorial Stadium in Little Rock, Arkansas. Head coach Bobby Petrino was in his second season at Arkansas. The Razorbacks finished the season 8–5, 3–5 in SEC play and won the Liberty Bowl 20–17 against East Carolina.

Leading into the 2009 season
Former Michigan State head coach John L. Smith was hired as special teams coordinator. He replaced Lorenzo Ward who took a spot with the South Carolina Gamecocks. Quarterback Ryan Mallett and linebacker Ryan Powers were both arrested before the season. Mallett's charge of public intoxication garnered national headlines, and Powers was charged with shoplifting from a Fayetteville Wal-Mart. Neither player was suspended.

Players

Additions
Punter Briton Forester signed with the team on March 2 out of Palomar College. Forester had previously competed at Hawaii in 2006 and 2007, and will be designated a junior at Arkansas. New special teams coach John L. Smith was integral in Forester's signing.

Southern Cal transfer Broderick Green was cleared to play by the NCAA on July 31, 2009. The running back transferred to Arkansas to be nearer his ill grandmother, who resides in Little Rock, Arkansas. He will have three years of eligibility remaining.

Departures
In a press release on December 16, 2008, Nathan Dick, brother of Casey Dick, announced his intentions to transfer from the University of Arkansas. His release was granted by Bobby Petrino. Dick transferred to in-state UCA. Crosby Tuck, a sophomore receiver from Shiloh Christian School, announced on February 23, 2009 that he would no longer play for the Razorbacks. The Springdale native's decision was based on an elbow injury against Kentucky in 2007, from which he has not returned. Tuck will remain at the University of Arkansas.

Sophomore linebacker Khiry Battle was dismissed from the team on June 29, 2009, due to an unspecified violation of team rules.

Recruits

Regular season

Schedule

Personnel

Coaching staff

Roster

Game summaries

Missouri State

Arkansas began the season with a bang as Dennis Johnson returned the opening kickoff 91 yards for a touchdown. The Razorbacks also threw for over 400 yards as a team for the first time in school history.

Ryan Mallett went 17 for 22 passing for 309 yards and a touchdown in his Razorbacks debut. He transferred from the University of Michigan following the 2007 season, and had to sit out the 2008 season in accordance with NCAA regulations. His backup, Tyler Wilson, was more efficient but less productive going 13 for 19 for 138 yards with an interception and two touchdowns. Senior running back Michael Smith scored from 15 yards out to make the score 14–0 Razorbacks. Broderick Green scored on a 1-yard touchdown plunge to make the score 21–3 to close the first quarter.

Van Stumon caught a Wilson pass for a two-yard touchdown, followed by a Bears score to push the Razorback advantage to 28–10. Alex Tejada added a short field goal before halftime to give the Hogs a 21-point lead. Joe Adams caught a 40-yard touchdown pass from Mallett to start the third quarter scoring, with the Hogs also notching another Tejada field goal. The fourth quarter produced another TD strike from Wilson, this time to Cobi Hamilton.

Smith finished with four carries for 43 yards and the score. True freshman Ronnie Wingo Jr. rushed eight times for 50 yards, Broderick Green rushed 10 times for 31 yards and a touchdown. Jarius Wright caught 6 passes for 139 yards, with Joe Adams snagging 4 for 70 and a TD. Cobi Hamilton had four grabs for 56 and a TD, Greg Childs caught 4 for 50 yds. Tight end D.J. Williams, named to the Mackey Award watch list, caught two passes for twenty yards. Razorback linebackers Wendel Davis and Jerry Franklin had five solo tackles each.

#20 Georgia

The fifth-largest crowd in Razorback Stadium history watched the Hogs and Dogs pile up over 1,000 yards of offense and numerous school records. Georgia QB Joe Cox threw for 375 yards and five scores. Bulldogs receiver A. J. Green had seven catches for 137 yards and two scores. Ryan Mallett of Arkansas completed 21 of 39 for 408 yards and five touchdowns. The yardage and touchdown totals both are school records. Razorback receiver Greg Childs caught five passes for 140 yards and two TDs.

Arkansas scored on their first two plays; Joe Adams catching an 18-yard pass from Ryan Mallett (Alex Tejada kick) followed by a Jarius Wright 48-yard pass from Mallett. Georgia scored on a Joe Cox TD pass and Blair Walsh field goal, followed by a Greg Childs 30-yard touchdown reception from Ryan Mallett to make it a 21–10 Razorback lead to end the first period. Early in the second quarter, Razorback linebacker Jerry Franklin was assessed two unsportsmanlike conduct penalties and was ejected. Georgia opened the second quarter scoring with an 80-yard run by Richard Samuel, followed by a 25-yard pass from Joe Cox to A.J. Green. Walsh added a field goal as time expired, giving UGA the first half, 27–21.

Arkansas forced Georgia into a three-and-out, followed by a 40-yard Ryan Mallett aerial to Greg Childs, to make it a 28–27 Arkansas advantage. Tavarres King of Georgia responded by catching a 50-yard pass from Cox. Arkansas replied when D.J. Williams snagged a 2-yard pass from Mallett. Georgia two-way player Orson Charles caught a 44-yard pass from Joe Cox to make the score 40–35. The Dogs attempted a two-point conversion, and A.J. Green caught the lob from Cox to make it 42–35. Razorback kicker Alex Tejada added a short field goal, making the score 42–38 to Georgia's advantage.

A.J. Green caught a 28-yard touchdown pass from Cox to give UGA an 11-point lead in the fourth quarter. The Razorbacks drove inside the Georgia 10-yard line, but settled for a field goal. Georgia subsequently took the ball and tacked on another field goal, making the final score 52–41.

The three-hour and forty-five-minute affair contained 25 penalties for 193 total yards. The two teams combined to run 125 plays. Joe Cox was named National Offensive Player of the Week by the Walter Camp Football Foundation for his efforts.

#3 Alabama

Arkansas visited Bryant–Denny Stadium on September 26 to play the third-ranked Alabama Crimson Tide.

Arkansas and Alabama battled to a 0–0 tie after the first quarter, with the two teams combining for five punts and six first downs. Trent Richardson got the scoring started for 'Bama, breaking numerous tackles on his way to a 52-yard touchdown run. After Arkansas punted on the ensuing possession, Alabama quarterback Greg McElroy completed a deep pass to Julio Jones for 50 yards and a touchdown out of the wildcat formation. Arkansas rushed for negative yardage in the second quarter, but was losing by only 14 at halftime.

Arkansas' offense got started in the third quarter on a Greg Childs 18-yard touchdown reception from Ryan Mallett. The Alex Tejada kick made it a 14–7 Alabama lead. Alabama's response was a single play: McElroy to Marquis Maze for an 80-yard touchdown pass. Arkansas' Dylan Breeding had his punt attempt blocked, setting up Mark Ingram to catch a 14-yard TD pass from McElroy. The Crimson Tide led 28–7 entering the fourth quarter, and Ingram's 2-yard run produced the 35–7 final score.

Texas A&M, Southwest Classic

Texas A&M and Arkansas renewed their past rivalry, now named the Southwest Classic, in Cowboys Stadium on October 3, 2009. Texas A&M took an early 10–0 lead on a Randy Bullock field goal and Jerrod Johnson 60-yard pass to Bran Jackson, but Arkansas responded with 30 unanswered points before halftime. TD passes from Ryan Mallett to Broderick Green and DeAnthony Curtis, followed by an 85-yard fumble return for a touchdown by Jerry Franklin, gave the Hogs a 21–10 lead. Alex Tejada made a field goal and Jarius Wright's 31-yard touchdown reception gave the Razorbacks a 30–10 lead at halftime.

The Aggies replied with a field goal from Bullock with 8:16 to play in the third quarter. Mallett hit Michael Smith for a 29-yard passing touchdown to close the third quarter scoring. Texas A&M receiver Ryan Tannehill caught a 3-yard pass from Johnson to make it a 19–37 game, but the Aggies failed the two-point conversion. After another Tejada field goal, Razorback true freshman Ronnie Wingo, Jr. broke loose for a 62-yard touchdown to produce the final margin of 47–19.

Texas A&M quarterback Jerrod Johnson completed 30 of 58 passes for 345 yards and two touchdowns. Ryan Mallett was 17 of 27 passing for 271 yards, four touchdowns and an interception. Joe Adams caught three passes for 110 yards to lead Arkansas in receiving. The contest took three hours and twenty six minutes to complete, and contained 151 plays, 91 of which were run by Texas A&M.

#17 Auburn

Former Auburn coach Tommy Tuberville provided his insight on the contest, stating over the radio on WJOX, "Arkansas can’t stop a cold, but they’ll try to score some points" and that Auburn would win "by three touchdowns". Bobby Petrino was an offensive coordinator for the Tigers under Tuberville in 2002, and was considered as Tuberville's successor after a dismal 2003 campaign.

Arkansas forced a three-and-out on the game's opening drive, and scored on a Broderick Green 2-yard run to give the Hogs an early 7–0 lead.  Early in the second quarter, Michael Smith broke a 25-yard touchdown run to give the Razorbacks a 13–0 edge. Tigers running back Mario Fannin fumbled the ensuing kickoff, recovered by Arkansas' Jerell Norton at the Auburn 34-yard line. Two plays later, Ryan Mallett completed a 16-yard touchdown pass to Greg Childs to stretch the lead to 20–0. Auburn's Wes Byrum hit on a 37-yard field goal before halftime, and Mallett completed a five-yard touchdown pass to D. J. Williams to make the Arkansas lead 27–3.

Arkansas punted to open the third quarter, but Jake Bequette's recovery of Ben Tate's fumble gave the Hogs the ball at the Arkansas 5-yard line. Ten plays later, Ryan Mallett rushed for a four-yard touchdown to make it 34–3 Hogs. Tate replied twice, first on a one-yard touchdown run, and later on a 60-yard touchdown scamper. Onterio McCalebb also scored on the ground for Auburn in the third quarter, cutting the Razorbacks' lead to 23–34. Broderick Green responded early in the fourth quarter on a 3-yard rushing score. Alex Tejada added a field goal to produce the final 44–23 margin. Arkansas won by 21 points, totally reversing Tommy Tuberville's prediction that the Tigers would prevail by three scores.

#1 Florida

With Florida favored to win by 25 points, the Arkansas Razorbacks pushed the top-ranked Gators to the edge. Arkansas sacked 2007 Heisman Trophy winner Tim Tebow six times and forced four turnovers, but missed a 31-yard Alex Tejada field goal that would have given the Hogs a 23–20 lead with 3:08 to play.

Jake Bequette set up the game's first points be forcing a Tebow fumble, recovered by Zach Stadther. The Hogs drove to the one-yard line before the first quarter ended tied scoreless. USC transfer Broderick Green plunged into the end zone to start the second quarter, and gave the Hogs a 7–0 lead. Tebow fumbled again on his team's ensuing possession, but the Razorbacks could not capitalize. UF receiver Aaron Hernandez fumbled for the third straight Gator possession, but the Hogs were forced to punt. Florida's kicker, Caleb Sturgis, kicked a 30-yard field goal on Florida's next possession to make the game 7–3 in favor of Arkansas.

The Razorbacks drove inside the UF five-yard line before halftime, but could only get a field goal. This gave the Hogs a 10–3 lead at the break, despite missing on every third down conversion.

Following the half time performance, Florida connected on a 51-yard field goal from Sturgis to cut the Razorbacks' lead to 10–6. Tramain Thomas made an outstanding play on UF's Chris Rainey later in the third quarter. He attempted to tackle Rainey in the open field, but fell to the turf. While falling, Thomas kicked the ball cleanly out of Rainey's arm, and it fell right to Thomas. The Hogs took over at Florida's 28-yard line, but missed a short field goal and were forced walk away empty from the encounter.

On Florida's ensuing possession, Tim Tebow connected with Deonte Thompson for a 77-yard touchdown pass. Ramon Broadway was peeking into the backfield on the play, and took a false step towards the line of scrimmage. This allowed Thompson to give the Gators a 13–10 lead. Arkansas replied with a drive fueled mostly by the efforts of Dennis Johnson, who started at running back instead of an injured Michael Smith. The drive's deciding play, however, was when Ryan Mallett missed an open Van Stumon in the end zone. The Hogs did connect on another Tejada field goal, tying the game at 13.

Early in the fourth quarter, Mallett was forced to step up in the pocket and sling a pass to Greg Childs on 3rd and 17. Childs caught the ball and outran several UF defenders to the end zone. It appeared that Childs lost the ball on the one-yard line, but after review it was decided that he maintained possession on the 75-yard scoring play. Arkansas had a 20–13 lead with 9:40 to play.

Florida responded with a 67-yard scoring drive, assisted by a 15-yard pass interference penalty and 15-yard personal foul penalty called consecutively against Arkansas. The CBS broadcasting team said that the calls were both "questionable". Top-ranked Florida tied the game at 20. The officiating crew was suspended by the Southeastern Conference the following week, and remained on suspension until November 14. Florida coach Urban Meyer later said that the SEC was right by suspending the crew, and Bobby Petrino was reprimanded by the SEC for publicly criticizing the crew after the contest.

Ryan Mallett later led a 56-yard drive to the UF 21-yard line, but Alex Tejada missed a potential game-winning field goal with 3:08 remaining. Tebow and company marched down the field to the Arkansas 10-yard line, finding Riley Cooper for three first downs on the drive. With thirteen seconds to play, Sturgis kicked the game-winning field goal, ending the Razorbacks' upset bid and preserving Florida's homecoming.

Ole Miss

The Arkansas Razorbacks traveled to Oxford, Mississippi to match up against former coach Houston Nutt.

Jevan Snead opened the scoring for the Ole Miss Rebels, running in from one yard out. The University of Texas transfer also completed a 25-yard touchdown pass to Shay Hodge to take a 14–0 Rebels lead. Ole Miss added a field goal from Joshua Shene before Arkansas scored. Knile Davis rumbled in from three yards out to draw the Razorbacks within 10. Before halftime, Snead lead what looked like a last-minute scoring drive until Arkansas defensive back Jerico Nelson intercepted a pass at the Arkansas six-yard line.

Andru Stewart intercepted another Snead pass early in the third quarter, leading to an Alex Tejada field goal. Ole Miss responded when Snead hit Dexter McCluster on a screen pass that McCluster took for a 64-yard touchdown. Arkansas scored on the ensuing possession when Ryan Mallett connected with Carlton Salters for a 58-yard touchdown. The ball was intended for Greg Childs, but Childs and two Rebel defenders tipped the ball to an uncovered Salters for the score. The Rebels added two more Shene field goals to make the final score 30–17. McCluster rushed 22 times for 123 yards. He also caught 7 passes for 137 yards and a touchdown.

Eastern Michigan

The Eastern Michigan Eagles came to Fayetteville on Halloween to play the Razorbacks on homecoming. Prior to the game, EMU was the top-ranked defense against the pass, but last against the run. The Hogs were without Michael Smith, who had a hamstring injury, but regained the services of WR Joe Adams.

Arkansas scored on its first drive when running back Knile Davis took the ball in from six yards out. The Hogs also scored on their next possession, a Broderick Green run over right guard for a touchdown. On the ensuing possession, EMU quarterback Kyle McMahon was intercepted by Freddie Burton, who returned the ball 50 yards for a touchdown. Early in the second quarter, Ryan Mallett found Joe Adams on a ten-yard crossing pattern for a score. Following a missed Alex Tejada field goal, Patrick Treppa punted for EMU, leaving the Razorbacks with the ball on their own one-yard line. However, on the next play, Broderick Green broke through the line and rumbled 99 yards for a touchdown. The score was the longest play in Arkansas Razorbacks history, longer than the previous record of 90 yards set by Billy Moore against Tulsa back in 1962. Following another EMU punt, Mallet found Adams for a 78-yard touchdown pass, giving the Hogs a 42–0 lead as the teams went to halftime. The Razorback defense did not allow EMU a single first down in the first half.

Following the homecoming halftime festivities, Seth Armbrust blocked an Eastern Michigan punt, and scooped it up for a touchdown. At this point, Kyle McMahon began to move the Eagles, scoring on their next two possessions, including a TD pass to Kinsman Thomas for 77 yards. Mallett responded with a 55-yard bomb to Cobi Hamilton, and Davis capped the drive two plays later to make it a 56–13 game. After another EMU score, Mallett found Lucas Miller for a sixteen-yard score. EMU tacked on another score, but the Razorbacks prevailed in a 63–27 rout.

Mallett finished completing 14 of 16 passes for 249 yards and three touchdowns. Broderick Green had 135 yards on nine rushes, including the 99-yard record-setting score. Joe Adams had 109 yards receiving in his first game after suffering a mild stroke.

Statistics

Team

Scores by quarter

Offense

Rushing

Passing

Receiving

Defense

Special teams 
 Kicking  Punting Returns

References

Arkansas
Arkansas Razorbacks football seasons
Liberty Bowl champion seasons
Arkansas Razorbacks football